The 23rd Goya Awards honouring the best in Spanish filmmaking of 2008 were presented on 1 February 2009 at the Madrid's Palacio Municipal de Congresos. The gala was hosted by Carmen Machi, also featuring Muchachada Nui.

Camino was the big winner of the night, winning 6 awards out 7 nominations, including Best Film, Actress, Director and Original Screenplay.

Winners and nominees

Major awards

Other award nominees

Honorary Goya
 Jesús Franco

References

23
2008 film awards
2008 in Spanish cinema
2009 in Madrid